The Ballochmyle Viaduct is the tallest extant railway viaduct in Britain. It carries the former Glasgow and South Western Railway line between Glasgow and Carlisle.

Designed by John Miller, the viaduct was built in the 1840s for the Glasgow, Paisley, Kilmarnock and Ayr Railway Company. Work commenced on its construction during March 1846; it was built under contract by Ross & Mitchell and William McCandlish was the resident engineer. It is built of local red sandstone and stronger stone sourced from Dundee was used for the arch rings. On completion on 2 March 1848, the viaduct had the largest masonry arch in the world and remains amongst the largest ever been constructed.

The viaduct was listed in April 1971 and became a Category A listed structure in January 1989. It was designated  a "Historic Civil Engineering Landmark" by the Institution of Civil Engineers (ICE) in 2014. Network Rail undertook strengthening work on the viaduct in the 2010s. The Ballochmyle Viaduct is used for passenger and freight traffic through to the present day.

History
The Ballochmyle Viaduct was designed by John Miller for the Glasgow, Paisley, Kilmarnock and Ayr Railway during the mid 1840s. The line was the northern part of the railway from Glasgow to Carlisle via Kilmarnock. The viaduct was required to cross the River Ayr. The resident engineer was William McCandlish and the contractors were Ross & Mitchell.

During March 1846, construction of the stone viaduct began. The viaduct incorporated a massive arch spanning the River Ayr. To build the arch, complex timber centring for temporary support was constructed over the river. The centring was considered to be noteworthy in its own right.

The viaduct was completed on 2 March 1848 but the line was not completed until 9 August 1850. At the time of its construction, the viaduct had the largest masonry arch in the world; 150 years later, it was amongst the biggest masonry arches to have ever been built. The viaduct carries double track railway across the river between Mauchline and Catrine; and tens of thousands of trains have crossed over it over the course of its lifetime.

The viaduct has been in continuous use to the present day; in 2014, it was in a good condition despite more than 160 years of service. During the early 2010s Network Rail upgraded the viaduct to strengthen it for heavy freight trains, particularly coal traffic.  The work, undertaken by contractor Carillion, was done without significant alteration to its external appearance.

Ballochmyle Viaduct was designated a listed structure during April 1971 and became a Category A listed structure in January 1989. It features in the 1996 film Mission: Impossible. During 2014, the viaduct was designated a National Historic Civil Engineering Landmark by the Institution of Civil Engineers (ICE) and a plaque was installed. The viaduct is also listed amongst those sites promoted by the East Ayrshire Council as being a local historical site.

Design

Ballochmyle Viaduct carries a double-track railway over the River Ayr. It has seven spans, three  spans at either side of the central  span. All the arches are semi-circular, built around an arch ring comprising hard stone quarried near Dundee and local red sandstone was used for the rest of the structure. While largely plain, the arches have some decorative ornamentation including raised panels on the spandrels, and the dressed stone arch rings. These details can be viewed from the riverside path that passes  underneath the central arch.

See also
 List of Category A listed buildings in East Ayrshire
 List of listed buildings in Mauchline, East Ayrshire
 List of longest masonry arch bridge spans
 List of railway bridges and viaducts in the United Kingdom

References

External links

 “Ballochmyle Viaduct article on ayrshirehistory.com.”
 “Images of the viaduct on scotlandsplaces.gov.uk.”
 “Painting of the Ballochmyle Viaduct, by David Octavius Hill.”
 "Civil Engineering in Ayrshire and Bute on icevirtuallibrary.com."

Railway bridges in Scotland
Listed bridges in Scotland
Category A listed buildings in East Ayrshire
1848 establishments in Scotland
Bridges completed in 1848
Viaducts in Scotland
Mauchline